Pirouz Hanachi (born 11 June 1963) is an Iranian architect, reformist politician and the former mayor of Tehran, succeeding Mohammad-Ali Afshani.

Hanachi served as deputy mayor for technical and development. He was appointed deputy mayor for urban development and architecture before his appointment as Tehran's mayor.

Early life 
Hanachi was born in Tehran in 1963. He holds a Master of Architecture (1991) and PhD (1999) from the University of Tehran. He served as a professor of architecture in the Fine Arts Faculty at the University of Tehran.

Career

Mayor 
Tehran's city council appointed Hanachi mayor on 13 November 2018. Winning 11 votes out of 21, Hanachi is the third mayor appointed by the fifth Islamic City Council of Tehran, and the 14th after the Islamic Revolution in 1979. He is the third mayor to be elected since reformists swept the city-council elections in May 2017. Initially, his security clearance was delayed, possibly in an attempt to damage his reformist movement.

Electoral history

References

1964 births
Living people
University of Tehran alumni
Academic staff of the University of Tehran
Iranian architects
Iranian Vice Ministers
Mayors of Tehran